The , officially called the All Japan Club Teams Soccer Tournament, is a football (soccer) cup competition in Japan.

It is run by the Japan Football Association, operating in a similar way to the Shakaijin Cup. It only involves teams that plays in their respective prefectural leagues around Japan. The 47 existing prefectural leagues combined forms the 7th tier of league football in Japan, a level below the Japanese Regional Leagues.

List of winners

See also
Japanese Super Cup
Emperor's Cup
J.League Cup
Japanese Regional Leagues
All Japan Senior Football Championship

References

Football cup competitions in Japan
1994 establishments in Japan
Recurring sporting events established in 1994